Mohamed Zairi is a British academic and researcher in the field of total quality management and excellence management.  Over a period of 35 years, he has been influencing Quality Management Thinking. He is also recognized as a luminary in the Global Quality Horizon. In addition to TQM and Excellence Management, Zairi has immense expertise in areas such as Performance Measurement, Business Process Management, Change Management, Innovation Management, Governance, and Service Improvement.

Zairi is also known as one of the main pioneers in the field of Benchmarking and Best Practice Management. He helped to bridge the gap between academic thinking and the application of practical solutions to problems by translating novel ideas and innovative concepts into useful and purposeful guidelines and blueprints that can be used by managers in all sectors of the industry and commerce. He is currently serving as the Editorial Director of the Benchmarking International Journal (BIJ), now in its 27th volume. In 2010, he was awarded the 2009 ASQ Grant Medal for the development of quality management educational programs. He was also awarded the Yoshio Kondo academic prize (2010), celebrating his outstanding research carried out over several years that have advanced the global body of quality knowledge.

Zairi is a frequent speaker and gave over 600 keynote addresses at national and international conferences. He also had numerous papers published in industry journals. He has written extensively about the role of Quality in all 4 Industrial Revolutions. At present, he is focusing on Quality in the digital era and is one of the originators of the concept of Quality 4.0. Recently, he has published several works on the disruptive thinking of Quality 4.0 in the World and is also leading a major research on Quality Future Thinking.

Over the last 25 years, Zairi has played a significant role in growing the quality movement in the MENA region. At present, he is acting as a senior advisor for Prime Minister's Office (UAE Government). He has also acted in the capacity of Jury Chairman of various government programs including the Abu Dhabi Award for Excellence in Government Performance, Dubai Government Excellence Program and Sheikh Khalifa Government Excellence Program.

Early life and work 

Zairi was born on 17 September 1956, the fifth of ten children and raised in a small Algerian town of El Kouif, 4 km from The Tunisian Border. His father worked in a phosphate mine all his life.

Zairi attended primary and secondary school in El Kouif and moved to Annaba, a relatively bigger town on Algeria's Mediterranean coast, to continue his college education.

He got his French Baccalaureate with distinction and immigrated to the UK in October 1975, to pursue his higher education. He completed his BSc (Hons) in Polymer Science and Technology from the University of Aston, Birmingham, in 1979; MSc in Safety Technology in 1980, from the same University; Postgraduate Diploma in Human Resource and Operations Management from De Montfort University, Leicester in 1985; and PhD in the Management of New Technology from the North Staffordshire Polytechnic (University of Staffordshire) in 1989.

Zairi began his career by working in the private sector as a production control coordinator and then moving on to be a production manager. He pioneered the Benchmarking and Best Practice Movement in the UK since mid 80s. During 1985-86, Zairi actively worked in the area of Advanced Manufacturing Technology (AMT) and created an industrial network for the exchange of Best Practices, and developed methods and guidelines useful to companies when considering the introduction of complex technology-based innovations. The work was later carried out at Staffordshire Polytechnic from 1986–1989.

Career Progression and Contributions 

Zairi was the first academic professional to be sponsored by Unilever PLC, in the area of Quality and Innovation Management in Europe, which had a lasting impact on the whole Unilever Group and hundreds of organisations covering the Fast-Moving Consumer Goods Sector, Engineering, Aerospace, Automobile, Communications and Computer Industry. He held the Unilever Sponsorship from 1990 to 1995 at the Bradford University School of Management.

In 1991, Zairi was appointed as a member of the European Foundation for Quality Management (EFQM) Working Group, UK for 2 years.

In 1993, Zairi was appointed by the UK Government as a Non Executive Director at Huddersfield NHS Trust since its inception as a Trust. During a period of six years (1993-1999), he has made significant contributions in various aspects such as support in the development of a Risk Management Strategy based on Quality Principles, which later became one of the flagships of the Trust and was adopted widely by other Trusts; the encouragement of the Trust to gain ISO 9000 Certification in several of its support services and the contribution of various papers and debates for the development of a seamless and patient orientated healthcare delivery approach.

Between 1994-95, Zairi helped set up the European Best Practice Benchmarking Award, for which he was appointed as Chairman.

European Centre for Best Practice Management (ECBPM) 
Since 1996, Zairi had taken up the responsibility of managing The European Centre for Total Quality Management (ECTQM). ECTQM, an entirely externally funded centre based within Bradford University School of Management, was aimed at supporting industry and commerce through applied research and advisory work in the area of Best Practice Management. In September 2009, ECTQM was renamed as European Centre for Best Practice Management (ECBPM) and became a standalone independent non-profit centre. ECBPM is now an internationally known and respected centre for Best Practice Management throughout the World.

The Middle East Quality Association (MEQA) 

ECTQM has been the architect in the launch of the Middle East Quality Association (MEQA) with Zairi as its first President for the period of 4 years. On 27 March 2006, MEQA was officially recognised as the fifth quality hub of the world at Burj Al Arab Hotel in Dubai, paving the way for the rest of the region to achieve greater standards in quality. MEQA functions as a non-profit organization, with the main purpose being the creation of economic growth and development in the Middle East and North Africa (MENA) and facilitating the free flow of information and the exchange of the best practices in the field of quality

Several PhD and M.Phil. students both in the UK and overseas worked under the supervision of Zairi. He has successfully examined 50 Doctoral thesis, covering a wide area of subjects and tackling different aspects of Quality Management and its implementation on a global basis, with a unique contribution to the development of theory and management concepts. Over the years, he has also undertaken various externally funded research projects.

Zairi is an Emeritus Professor at the Bradford University School of Management, UK, since September 2009.

Currently, he is also the Founder of Zairi Institute, an organisation designed to disseminate the Best Management philosophy and techniques more widely.

Co-founder of Hamdan Bin Mohammed Smart University 

The establishment of Hamdan Bin Mohammed e-University (HBMeU) (now Hamdan Bin Mohammed Smart University (HBMSU)) started in 2001. Zairi led the Academic Vision right from the onset as a co-founder. The first milestone was the establishment of the e-TQM College, which became a global beacon for TQM. The second milestone was the launch of Hamdan Bin Mohammed e-University (HBMeU) in 2009, which later was rebranded as Hamdan Bin Mohammed Smart University (HBMSU) to reflect the latest digital technological evolution.

Endowed chairs

SABIC Chair 
In 1995, Zairi was appointed to the prestigious SABIC Chair in Best Practice Management at the European Centre for Total Quality Management (ECTQM), University of Bradford, UK which he held until 2004.

JURAN Chair 
From 2004, Zairi held the unique and prestigious Juran Chair in Total Quality Management for 10 years.

Joseph M. Juran known as Father of Quality has contributed to this field more than any other person over a longer period. In February 2005, Zairi was honoured with an invitation from Joseph M. Juran to visit him at his home in the USA, to receive his personal congratulations.

On 2 June 2005, Zairi held the inaugural lecture for the Juran Chair in Total Quality Management.

He worked on the extension of Juran's philosophy (quality trilogy) to include internet-based business environments and the focus on customer centricity since 2004. This gradually led to the establishment of a new concept coined as Excellence Tetralogy.

Organizational affiliations 

 Fellow of the Chartered Management Institute
 Fellow of the Royal Society for the encouragement of Arts, Manufactures and Commerce
 Fellow of the Hong Kong Quality Management Association
 Fellow of the Chartered Quality Institute
 Fellow of the American Society for Quality

Government sectors 
Over the years, Zairi has guided and supported several government entities such as Saudi Standards, Metrology and Quality Org and Al Ain Municipality.

Initiatives 

Some initiatives that Zairi had supported include the launch and development of Regional Award Scheme, known as Excellence Yorkshire in 2000. It was intended to encourage the use of quality management principles in both public and private sector organisations operating in Yorkshire and the Humber.  He was also a board member. Later, it was merged with other regional awards, which is now known as the North of England Excellence like a federation.

The launch of SME Knowledge Network in 2001, for supporting the growth and to help small and medium-sized enterprises in the UK, with the adoption of Best Practice concepts and to facilitate the sharing and transfer of useful ideas.

The setting up of Excellence in Schools Initiative in September 2002. This scheme encouraged schools to adopt the principles of quality and excellence through self-assessment and the generic model of Excellence. It was supported by Lloyds TSB who, through their Quality in Education scheme have been assisting thousands of schools throughout the country. This scheme had generated a lot of interest amongst more than 600 targeted schools and a Network of Best Practice Exchanges was established.

Zairi also assisted in the implementation of several Excellence and National Quality Award Programs.

Publications
Since the late 1980s, Zairi has been prolifically contributing to the field of quality and related topics through his presence at conferences and publishing. He has published over 70 books and 400 scientific papers, most of which have been refereed and published in international journals. He has participated in the growth and development of various concepts, some of which he has been the catalyst and originator. Zairi also has contributed chapters to books and viewpoints in various professional magazines.

Some of his books, magazines and editorship journals:

 M. Zairi (1991), Total Quality Management for Engineers, Woodhead Publishing Limited, Cambridge, England. Reprint 1993 by Butterworth-Heinemann, Oxford, England, and Waltham, Massachusetts, USA.  / 
 M. Zairi (1992), The Management of Advanced Manufacturing Technology: Current issues and Implications, Sigma Press Ltd. Reprint 1992 by John Wiley & Sons, Malden, Massachusetts USA.  / 
 Zairi, M (1994), Measuring performance for business results, Chapman & Hall of London. Reprint 1994 by Springer.  / 
 Zairi, M & P. Leonard (1994), A complete guide to practical benchmarking: the driving force for culture change, Chapman & Hall. Reprint 1994 by Springer,  / 
 Zairi, M (1996), Effective Benchmarking: Learning from the Best, Chapman & Hall.  / 

Zairi, M (2009), Benchmarking and Performance Management: Contribution to Theory and Application, ECBPM Publishing House, Bradford, UK . 
 Zairi, M (2009), Total Quality Management: Contributions to theory and Application, ECBPM Publishing House, Bradford, UK
 Zairi, M. (2009), Total Transformational Thinking in Academic Leadership: A New DNA, ECBPM Publishing House, Keighley, UK,
 Zairi, M. (2012), Empathy: If Quality matters why doesn't the Customer?, ECBPM Publishing House, Keighley, UK,

M.Zairi (2013), LoE 00 Leadership of Excellence Explained; 1st edition,2013; ; ASIN: B07MJ3WYLR; 
M.Zairi (2018), Deep in Crisis; Quality4.0 series, 1st edition,2018; ; ASIN: B07F5VLVCK; 
M.Zairi (2018), Super Excellence; Quality4.0 series, 1st edition,2018; ; ASIN: B07F5W4KFL; 
M.Zairi (2019), An Assessment Guide; Quality4.0 series, 1st edition,2019; ; ASIN: B07NPSLHH4; 
Founding Editor of The International Journal of Excellence in Education
The International Journal of Excellence in Government, 1st edition 2019;

Recognition, awards & medals

References

External links
European Centre for Best Practice Management – official site
 An interview with Professor Mohamed Zairi – Józefa Fawcett on JFI Radio Academic interview – Mohamed Zairi   
 Academic Interview – Performance Magazine editorial team interviewed Professor Mohamed Zairi   
 An interview with Professor Mohamed Zairi   
 Guru Interview by Sarah Powell – Emerald Publishing Group   
 Media Coverage - Zairi at inaugural session of the Egyptian Government Excellence Conference 2018.

Academics of the University of Bradford
Living people
1956 births
Algerian expatriates in the United Kingdom
British businesspeople
British consultants